East Liverpool Junior/Senior High School is a public high school in East Liverpool, Ohio, United States.  It is the only secondary school in the East Liverpool City School District, serving the city and surrounding Glenmoor, La Croft and Liverpool Township. Athletic teams compete as the East Liverpool Potters in the Ohio High School Athletic Association as a member of the Buckeye 8 Athletic League as well as the Ohio Valley Athletic Conference.

History
The first consolidated high school in East Liverpool was located on East 4th Street in Downtown. This building included a clock tower. The school operated as the main building from 1894 to 1914, and then as a campus school for underclassmen until 1968. After its closure, the building was demolished. Today, a replica clock tower and a small adjoining building have since been built on this site. The building houses the East Liverpool High School Alumni Association.

Built in 1914, the second high school building house upperclassmen from its completion until 1968, when the high school was moved to its current campus. The building was sold to Kent State University in 1968 for $1, and since has been home to Kent State University at East Liverpool. The Memorial Auditorium, built in 1945, is now a YMCA.

In 2010, students from grades 7 and 8 were moved into the building from the former East Junior High School.

Campus
East Liverpool High School is located on a hill off of the city's Maine Boulevard via the school's driveway, dubbed "Potter Pride Drive".

ELHS consists of three buildings. The main building houses most of the classes, the office, and cafeteria. At the other end of the parking lot is the vocational building, where some of the career tech classes are located. Adjacent to the main building and also across from the vocational building is the Potter Fieldhouse. Here, the school's gymnasium, auditorium, and band room are located, as well as a few classrooms. Additionally, North Elementary School is located past the fieldhouse on campus.

Academics
According to the National Center for Education Statistics, in 2019, the school reported an enrollment of 557 pupils in grades 9th through 12th and 324 students in grades 7th and 8th, with 808 pupils eligible for a federal free or reduced-price lunch. The school employed 67 teachers, yielding a student–teacher ratio of 12.38 for Senior High and 14.73 for Junior High.

East Liverpool High School offers courses in the traditional American curriculum. 

Entering their third and fourth years, students can elect to attend the Columbiana County Career and Technical Center in Lisbon as either a part time student, taking core courses at ELHS, while taking career or technical education at the career center, or as a full time student instead. Students may choose to take training in automotives, construction technology, cosmetology, culinary arts, health sciences, information technology, multimedia, landscape & environmental design, precision machining, veterinary science, and welding. 

A student must earn 28 credits to graduate, including: 4 credits in a mathematics sequence, 3 credits in science, including life and physical science, 4 credits in English, 3 credits in a social studies sequence, 1 credit in fine art, 1 credit in health and physical education, 1 credit in personal finance, and 4.5 elective credits. Elective courses can be in English, science, social studies, foreign language, technology and business, family and consumer science, and fine art. Students attending the career center follow the same basic requirements, but have requirements in career & technical education rather than fine arts. All students must pass Ohio state exams in English I & II, Algebra I, Geometry, Biology, American History, and American Government, or the like.

Athletics
East Liverpool High School has been a member of the Ohio Valley Athletic Conference since 1973, and the related Buckeye 8 Athletic League since 2013. They were also part of the River Valley Conference (1990-1999) and Metro Athletic Conference (2006-2008). The high school fields sports teams in baseball, basketball, bowling, cross country running, football, golf, soccer, softball, swimming, tennis, track and field, volleyball and wrestling.

Athletic facilities
Patterson Field is located in the West End and is home to varsity and junior varsity football. The Potter Fieldhouse, located near the high school on Potter Pride Drive, houses the gymnasium where basketball and volleyball games, as well as wrestling meets, take place. The Frank J. Mangano Memorial Olympic Track is located down the hill from ELHS and the Fieldhouse and is home to track meets, freshman football games, soccer games, and some band practices. There is also a baseball field on campus. Off-campus facilities include Thompson Park for softball, Walnut Lanes in downtown East Liverpool for bowling, the Calcutta YMCA for swim, and Turkana Golf Course in Calcutta for golf.

Notable alumni
Bernie Allen, professional baseball player in Major League Baseball 
Less Browne, professional football player in the United States Football League and Canadian Football League
John Caparulo, comedian 
Lou Holtz, college football head coach in the National Collegiate Athletic Association (NCAA) and analyst for ESPN
Josh Stansbury, professional mixed martial artist in the Ultimate Fighting Championship (UFC)

Notes and references

External links
 

High schools in Columbiana County, Ohio
East Liverpool, Ohio
Public high schools in Ohio